Oskar Wilhelm Wetzell (5 December 1888 – 28 November 1928) was a Finnish diver, who competed at the 1908 and the 1912 Summer Olympics.

Diving

Olympics 

Wetzell was the first deaf person ever to compete at the Olympics twice. He is also the only deaf Finnish Olympian.

National 
He won eight Finnish national championships in diving:
 springboard diving: 1908, 1909, 1912, 1913, 1921
 platform diving: 1909, 1911, 1913

He represented the clubs Helsingfors Simsällskap and Helsingin Uimarit.

Biography 

Oskar Wetzell became deaf after being confronted with influenza when he was just two years old. He was sent to the Porvoo Deaf School at the age of seven. His father worked initially at the Sinebrychoff Brewery in Helsinki and later went onto become a merchant.

He became interested in stage magic at the age of 20. In the 1920s he performed in clubs and major charity events. He modeled his show after Tobias Bamberg.

He married Selma Maria Forsström in 1916. They had four children.

He was an inaugural board member of the Nordic Balticum Deaf Sport Federation. He was a founding member of the Finnish Deaf Sports Federation, and was its secretary in 1921–1922.

He died of stomach cancer.

References 
 

1888 births
1928 deaths
Finnish male divers
Olympic divers of Finland
Divers at the 1908 Summer Olympics
Divers at the 1912 Summer Olympics
Deaf divers
Finnish deaf people
Divers from Helsinki
People from Uusimaa
Deaths from stomach cancer